Dino Stecher (born April 5, 1964) is a Swiss ice hockey coach and former goaltender. He is formerly the head coach for EHC Basel of the Swiss National League B.

Stecher was named the 1993-94 National League A Goaltender of the Year.

References

External links

1964 births
Living people
ECH Chur players
EHC Olten players
HC Fribourg-Gottéron players
Swiss ice hockey coaches
Swiss ice hockey goaltenders
ZSC Lions players